Liu Weijia (born 15 February 1989) is a Chinese former freestyle and medley swimmer who competed in the 2004 Summer Olympics.

References

1989 births
Living people
Chinese male medley swimmers
Swimmers from Shenyang
Chinese male freestyle swimmers
Olympic swimmers of China
Swimmers at the 2004 Summer Olympics
21st-century Chinese people